Mons Calpe S.C. is a professional football and sporting club from Gibraltar. Founded in 2013, the club's first team plays in the Gibraltar National League. Mons Calpe also has a U-23 squad, futsal teams and darts.

History
Mons Calpe S.C. was formed by Kieran Alman, James Read, Phillip Debono, Richard Lavagna and Adrian Ballestero in 2013 after Gibraltar's admittance into UEFA sparked a boom in interest in football on the Rock. After an impressive maiden season in the 2013–14 Gibraltar Second Division, the club finished second in the league. However, the club succumbed to a 2–0 defeat to St Joseph's in the promotion/relegation playoff that year. The following season saw the club struggle to emulate the same form, against much stronger promotion contenders, which saw the club lingering in mid-table for much of the season and eventually finishing 8th.

After a significant rebuild over the summer of 2015, Mons Calpe had a second chance at promotion through the end-of-season playoff against Premier Division side FC Britannia. A victory in that game saw the young club seal their first-ever season in the top-flight of Gibraltarian football.

The summer after gaining promotion, Mons Calpe's football structure went through a total reconstruction to further professionalise the club, highlighted by a majority-share investment by a US-based group led by Jose Alfredo Reygadas. The Calpeans then appointed Brazilian/Portuguese coach William Amaral de Andrade as first team head coach and former Gibraltar U19 Manager Terrence Jolley as his assistant manager for the 2016–17 season. After a bad run of form in winter saw them slip from 3rd to 5th, William was sacked on 16 January and replaced by Jolley on an interim basis. On 17 March, Italian manager Mauro Ardizzone was appointed head coach, with Jolley returning to his role as assistant. Ardizzone eventually saw the Calpeans to a 5th-place finish in their maiden Premier Division season, including a notable 2–2 draw with Lincoln Red Imps in the penultimate round.

At the start of the 2017–18 season, the Calpeans named Albert Ferri as their new manager. However, poor results led to his dismissal in December 2017, and renowned Argentinean manager Luis Manuel Blanco replaced him as first team head coach. After Blanco's arrival, the club won 14 of their next 22 matches in all competitions, finishing with a club-high 44 points in the top-flight and reaching the Rock Cup final, losing 2–1 to Europa.

The 2018–19 season started slowly, but Mons Calpe put together a serious challenge for a European spot, putting together the best season in its short history in the Premier Division. The club ended with its highest point total (49) and best position in the league table (4th), only 6 points behind St. Joe's for the last UEFA Europa League berth, despite beating the Saints twice and drawing once in their 3 regular season match-ups. The Calpeans also made a deep run in the Rock Cup, beating St. Joseph's again 4–1 in the quarterfinal, but falling short of a second consecutive Cup final after losing 1–0 to Gibraltar United in the semifinal. Manager Blanco left his role at the club on 28 May 2019.

In the 2020–21 season, Mons Calpe qualified for European competition for the first time. In 2022, the club also established a farm team in the fourth tier Liga TDP in Mexico, with Mons Calpe S.C. Yucatán entering the league.

Seasons

European record

As of match played 15 July 2021

Notes
 QR: Qualifying round

Current squad

First Team squad

References

External links 
 Official website
 

 
Association football clubs established in 2013
Football clubs in Gibraltar
Gibraltar National League clubs
2013 establishments in Gibraltar